The Gaiman Formation, in older literature also referred to as Patagonian Marine Formation (Patagoniense), is a fossiliferous geologic formation of the Peninsula Valdés Basin in the eastern Chubut Province of northwestern Patagonia, eastern Argentina.

The Gaiman Formation has provided fossils of many extinct penguins, among which five species in the genus Palaeospheniscus, as well as whales and dolphins, most notably Aondelphis talen, Prosqualodon australis, Idiorophus patagonicus and Argyrocetus patagonicus, indeterminate seal and turtle fossils, shark and other fossils.

Description 

The Gaiman Formation was first defined by Mendía & Bayarsky in 1981, and further described by Mendía in 1983, taking its name from Gaiman in Chubut Province, eastern Patagonia. Gaiman in the local language of the native Tehuelche people means "rocky point". The formation crops out in the lower course of the Chubut River, and overlies the continental Trelew Member of the Sarmiento Formation and is overlain by the Late Miocene Puerto Madryn Formation.

The Gaiman Formation is correlated with the Chenque Formation of the Golfo San Jorge Basin and the Monte León Formation of the Austral Basin to the south, the Saladar Member of the lower Gran Bajo del Gualicho Formation of the Colorado Basin to the north and the Vaca Mahuida Formation of the Neuquén Basin to the northwest.

Depositional environment 
The basal stratum of the Gaiman Formation is a thin transgressive lag with some gravels, bones and teeth from marine vertebrates. The unit displays a concentration of phosphatic concretions, ooids, bones and teeth. The marine sediments overlying this basal stratum are composed of white, tuffaceous, thoroughly bioturbated mudstones and fine sandstones with occasional mollusk molds and thin oyster horizons, deposited in a shallow shelf environment.

The marine transgression leading to the deposition of the Gaiman Formation is the first of two major South Atlantic transgressions of the Miocene, the second causing the deposition of the overlying Puerto Madryn Formation.

Facies analysis shows that the formation represents a transgressive-regressive stratigraphic cycle, with palaeoenvironments including coastal, storm-dominated shoreface, inner shelf embayment and open inner shelf.

The age of the Gaiman Formation is established on stratigraphic correlations to other absolutely-dated sections in Patagonia and biostratigraphic data and dates to the Early Miocene (Burdigalian, or Colhuehuapian in the SALMA classification).

Paleontological significance 

The Gaiman Formation has provided several fossil penguins, of which nine are assigned to specific species and include five species of the genus Palaeospheniscus. Also, shark teeth, fossils of indeterminate seals and turtles, and several dolphins, baleen and toothed whales have been found in the formation. Argentine paleontologist Florentino Ameghino described an isolated tooth from the formation first as an ichthyodectiform fish, Portheus patagonicus in 1901, however this fossil was assigned to a delphinoid cetacean of the family Kentriodontidae by Cione and Cozzuol in 1990. Fish recorded from the formation are hexanchiform hexanchids, lamniform isurids, odontaspidids, cetorhinids, carcharhiniform carcharhinids, heterodontiform heterodontids, squatiniform squatinids myliobatiform myliobatids, perciform oplegnathids and labrids, and tetraodontiform molids. Rays are abundant in the formation. The lack of somatic remains of most molluscs, bryozoans, polychaetes and cirripeds in the formation is attributed to the high-energy and corrosive environment at time of deposition, as well as diagenesis after the formation was deposited.

The bird species Eretiscus tonnii solely occurs in the Gaiman Formation. Bite marks on several of the penguin bones are attributed to terrestrial mammals such as didelphid or hathliacyniid sparassodont marsupials, common in Patagonia during the Miocene. Other ichnofossils found on the bones are presumably caused by dental erosion by regular echinoids, and bite marks by sharks, as Galeocerdo aduncus.

Fossil content 
The formation has provided the following fossils:

See also 
 South American land mammal ages
 Uitpa Formation, contemporaneous fossiliferous formation of the Cocinetas Basin, Colombia
 Castillo Formation, contemporaneous fossiliferous formation of the Falcón Basin, Venezuela
 Biblián Formation, contemporaneous fossiliferous formation of Ecuador
 Bahía Inglesa Formation, contemporaneous fossiliferous formation of Chile

References

Bibliography 
Geology
 
 
 
 

Paleontology

Further reading 
 
 
 

 
Geologic formations of Argentina
Miocene Series of South America
Neogene Argentina
Burdigalian
Colhuehuapian
Mudstone formations
Sandstone formations
Shallow marine deposits
Formations
Formations
Chonan languages